A destructive tornado outbreak devastated parts of the U.S. Upper Midwest on April 20, 2004. A total of 31 tornadoes formed in eastern Iowa, extending into northern and central Illinois and Indiana. A tornado that struck Utica, Illinois, was the only one to cause fatalities. An unusual feature of the outbreak is the fact that it was largely unexpected, as the SPC only predicted a "slight risk" of severe weather on the day of the event.

Confirmed tornadoes
Source:

Granville–Utica, Illinois

The only fatal tornado of the outbreak touched down in Putnam County, Illinois north of Florid before moving east and striking Granville. Witnesses reported a multiple-vortex tornado just prior to its arrival in Granville. The town was bisected by the half-mile-wide tornado with 12 buildings destroyed, 45 with major damage, and 26 with minor damage (mainly residential). The Granville State National Bank lost its roof, and Hopkins Elementary School lost the roof over the old gymnasium with damage in nearly all the classrooms. Significant damage also occurred to Granville Drugs, the only drug store in town. In a strange twist of irony, the town had finally recovered from a major fire 4 years earlier that decimated much of the business district. In Granville, 5 people were injured by the tornado, including an elderly woman who suffered a heart attack during the tornado and was eventually evacuated via Life Flight to a Peoria hospital. Injuries were low due to the 32 minutes of lead time before the tornado struck Granville. Damage in Granville was estimated to be at least $8 million, with the school suffering at least $3.5 million in damage. Damage in town was rated high-end F2.

As the tornado continued northeast, and F2 intensity damage was done to several homes in a subdivision near the intersection of East 250th and 2569th Roads. Several roofs were blown off homes, along with damage to external walls. Significant tree damage was done as well. The tornado then continued northeast, crossing the Illinois River twice as it moved toward the town of Utica, downing a steel high tension tower on the north bank of the river, immediately west of Illinois Route 251. The tornado moved into the southwest side of Utica where it was at F0 intensity. Homes along Washington Street only had tree and minor roof damage. A church steeple was damaged between Johnson and Washington streets. Roofs and trees were more severely damaged on the south side of Johnson Street. The tornado rapidly increased to F3 intensity on the north side of Johnson Street where one home had its roof taken off, and north walls were blown out. A machinery building was completely destroyed on the south side of the canal and a semi-tractor trailer was blown into the canal. A large grain bin was blown across the canal and flattened. The tornado then moved north of the canal into the heart of town where several homes were severely damaged, garages were destroyed, and brick buildings collapsed. Eight people died and seven were rescued from the basement of the turn of the century sandstone Milestone Tap tavern. The structure collapsed when a vehicle was thrown into it. The tornado was approximately 250 yards wide at this point. On the east edge of the vortex along Mill Street, in downtown, buildings suffered damage to facades, roofs and windows. East of Mill Street there was damage to trees and minor roof damage. In the northeast section of town a mobile home was overturned just east of Mill Street. The vortex crossed the railroad tracks and apparently dissipated on a steep bluff on the northeast side of town. At the top of the hill there were some trees and limbs downed, and some debris from town was deposited.

On June 2, 2004, the Village Clerk's son was stillborn. The clerk, Angela Brown, had worked 16-hour days following the tornado hit until his birth, and she stated her doctors attributed his death in part to stress as a result of this work. In a memorial service on April 19, 2005, the city of Utica recognized him as the ninth victim (though this death is not counted in the official NCDC total).

See also
List of North American tornadoes and tornado outbreaks
List of tornadoes with confirmed satellite tornadoes

References

External links 

 Chicago Tribune Special Report: Wicked Wind (Chicago Tribune)
 Severe Weather Outbreak of April 20, 2004 (NWS Central Illinois)
 Preliminary Storm Survey Results for the April 20, 2004 Clinton County Iowa Tornadoes (NWS Quad Cities, IA/IL)
 Preliminary Storm Survey Results for the April 20, 2004 Putnam & Bureau County Tornadoes (NWS Quad Cities, IA/IL)
 Tornadoes in a Deceptively Small CAPE Environment: The 4/20/04 Outbreak in Illinois and Indiana (Albert E. Pietrycha, Jonathan M. Davies, Mark Ratzer, and Paul Merzlock)
 Storm Survey Results for the April 20, 2004 Clinton County Tornadoes (NWS Quad Cities, IA/IL)
 Storm Survey Results for the April 20, 2004 Putnam & Bureau County Tornadoes (NWS Quad Cities, IA/IL)
 Federal Disaster Declaration (Federal Emergency Management Agency)

F3 tornadoes
Tornadoes of 2004
Tornadoes in Illinois
LaSalle County, Illinois
2004 natural disasters in the United States
April 2004 events in the United States